The 1975 World Table Tennis Championships men's doubles was the 33rd edition of the men's doubles championship. 

István Jónyer and Gábor Gergely won the title after defeating Dragutin Šurbek and Antun Stipančić in the final by three sets to one.

Results

See also
 List of World Table Tennis Championships medalists

References

-